The Ford Zephyr is an executive car manufactured by Ford of Britain from 1950 until 1972. The Zephyr and its luxury variants, the Ford Zodiac and Ford Executive, were the largest passenger cars in the British Ford range from 1950 until their replacement by the Consul and Granada models in 1972.

Initially, the four-cylinder version was named Ford Consul, but from 1962, both four- and six-cylinder versions were named Zephyr.

History
The Mark I Ford Consul and Zephyr models were first displayed at the Earls Court Motor Show in 1950. They were the first mass-produced British cars to use the MacPherson strut independent front suspension, which is widely used today. Production began with the Consul on 1 January 1951. The Mark I model ran until 1956. From April 1956, the Mark II Consul, Zephyr, and Zodiac went on sale and were known as the Three Graces. The Mark II range was popular, and finished its run in 1962, when from April that year the Mark III Zephyr 4, Zephyr 6, and Zodiac went on sale. The Consul name was dropped, with the car's place in the Ford UK line-up being filled by the first four-cylinder Ford Zephyr. While the Mark II Zephyr and Zodiacs had shared the same body (the Consul had shorter front guards and bulkhead), the new Zodiac and Zephyrs launched in 1962 shared few body panels. With the Mark III, Ford finally sorted out problems that had beset previous models (Mark I axles and Mark II gearboxes were particular weaknesses) and the Mark III proved to be popular and the most durable of the range. The model sold at a rate equal to or better than the Mark II, both in the UK and overseas, but was in production for a shorter time. During the last months of production, an upmarket Executive version was added to the Mark III range. The Mk III range was discontinued in January 1966, and the completely new Zephyr/Zodiac Mark IV range was released in April 1966. This car's design anticipated the later Consul/Granada range with V-type engines and independent rear suspension, but the development of the model was rushed, which was reflected in its durability. It was one of the first medium-priced cars to feature rear disc brakes.

The Zephyr was the last car to be independently designed by Ford of Britain; closer integration with Ford-Werke of Cologne had already started with both the Transit and Escort, and the replacement Consul/Granada would be a genuine pan-European effort.

Although the Ford Zephyr never saw American production, a very limited number were imported into the U.S., and the name itself has appeared on other American Ford-related cars. The first use of the Zephyr name was in 1936 with the Lincoln Zephyr a smaller companion to the full-sized Lincoln sedan sold at the time, followed in the late 1970s with the Mercury Zephyr, an upscale version of the Ford Fairmont. The Lincoln Zephyr name was resurrected for a new model in 2006, but was changed to Lincoln MKZ the following year.

Mark I

Zephyr Six (or Zephyr Mark I)

Model number EOTTA

The first of the Zephyr range was a lengthened version of the four-cylinder  Consul, with a  six-cylinder engine producing . Like the Consul, the Zephyr came with a three-speed gearbox, controlled by a column-mounted lever (three-on-the-tree). The front suspension design employed what  later came to be known as MacPherson struts while a more conventional configuration for the rear suspension used a live axle with half-elliptical springs.

The Ford Zephyr Six was available with four-door saloon, estate, and two-door convertible bodies. The convertible version was made by Carbodies and had a power-operated hood; the estate car was by Abbotts of Farnham and was sold as the Farnham.

In addition to the main British Ford factory in Dagenham, the Consul and Zephyr were assembled at Ford New Zealand's Seaview factory in Lower Hutt from knock-down  kits. The large Fords competed with the also locally built Vauxhall Wyvern and Velox, and later the Australian Holden. When newly crowned Queen Elizabeth II visited New Zealand as part of a Commonwealth tour in the early 1950s, she was pictured watching Zephyrs being built at the local Ford plant.
The Consul and Zephyr were also assembled at the Cork plant in Ireland from 1951 to 1956.

In 1953, a Ford Zephyr Six driven by Maurice Gatsonides won the Monte Carlo rally, pushing a Jaguar Mark VII into second place in the process.  Two years later, a Ford Zephyr Six driven by Vic Preston (Snr) and D P Marwaha won the East African Safari Rally.

The test car cost £842 including taxes, but was fitted with optional leather trim, heater, and radio.

Zephyr Zodiac (or Zodiac Mark I)

Model number EOTTA

The Zephyr Zodiac (or Zodiac Mark I) was an upmarket version of the Zephyr launched at the London Motor Show in autumn 1953. It had two-tone paintwork, leather trim, a heater, windscreen washers, whitewall tyres, and spot lights.

The test car cost £851 including taxes.

No official records exist of Zephyr Zodiac convertibles being produced, but  a few estate cars were built.

Mark II

Zephyr Mark II

Model number 206E

In 1956, the Consul, Zephyr, and Zodiac were all restyled. The weight distribution and turning circle were also improved.

The Zodiac and Zephyr were also offered in two body styles, the "Highline" and "Lowline", depending on the year of manufacture — the difference being  being cut from the height of the roof panel. The "Highline" variant featured a hemispherical instrument cluster, whereas the "Lowline" had a more rectangular panel.

The performance of the Zephyr and the Zodiac series II models likely was restricted by the rudimentary exhaust system, both the manifold assembly and the exhaust itself. The well-known Raymond Mays complete engine conversion boosted the performance figures to a top speed of 101 mph and 0–60 to 10.0s, with a standing quarter mile of 17.6s, as recorded by The Autocar in the issue dated 8 November 1957.

As well as a three-speed manual gearbox, an  overdrive was optional, and from 1956 (1959 in Australia), a Borg Warner DG automatic transmission was available. At first, drum brakes were fitted all round (with a larger lining area of ), but front discs became optional in 1960 and standard from mid-1961 (in Australia, only four-wheel drum brakes were available; some dealers fitted servo-assistance from 1961).

A two-door convertible version was offered with power-operated hood. Because of the structural weaknesses inherent in the construction of convertibles, few  are known to survive.

The test car cost £1193 including taxes.

Australian production
In Australia, the Mark II Consul, Zephyr, and Zodiac were built at Ford Australia's factory in Geelong. Sedan, coupe utility [more commonly abbreviated to "Ute"], and both four-cylinder Consul and six-cylinder Zephyr station wagon versions were produced. No Zodiac version station wagons were offered. The Australian-developed Mark II Station Wagon differed from its British Estate Car counterpart in having a wind-up rear window, and a straight C pillar, rather than a curved one. A handful of Station Wagons were registered in 1958, but sales did not really commence until about halfway through 1959. Also, the Australian-designed and -developed ute version differed significantly in its cab design and rear panels to that of its British counterpart. Mark II manufacture continued until 1962, when production switched to the assembly of Mark IIIs from imported complete knock-down (CKD) kits. It had originally been planned by Ford Australia to facelift the Mark II as its main competitor to the rival  Holden, but due to the exorbitant price being asked for by Ford UK for its now redundant  production jigs for the Mark II, Ford Australia chose to instead locally manufacture the  newly released North American Ford Falcon, which was significantly cheaper to manufacturer than the Zephyr, with the Mark III being relegated to special order only.

New Zealand assembly
New Zealand assembly of the Mark II, also from CKD kits, now included the Zodiac. The big Fords from Britain were now offered alongside the Australian-sourced Ford Falcon and also competed with the Vauxhall Victor and Velox, Holden, and Australia's Chrysler Valiant. Supplies were restricted due to strict import licensing rules in place at the time, and demand always exceeded availability;  not uncommonly, buyers waited two to three years for their new big Ford.

Zodiac Mark II

Model number 206E

The Mark II Zodiac was slightly altered to distinguish it from the lesser variants, having more elaborate tail-end styling and at the front, a different grille. The auxiliary lamps and wing mirrors were deleted from the Zodiac range, but it retained two-tone paint, whitewall tyres, chrome wheel-trim embellishers, and gold-plated badges.

The test car cost £968 including taxes.

Abbott Estates

Mark III

Zephyr 4 Mark III

Model 211E

In April 1962, Ford replaced the Consul/Zephyr/ Zodiac range with a dramatically restyled model, although it shared some of its mechanical components, as well as the basic chassis design, with the Mark II models.  Rather than continue the Consul name, Ford UK decided to call its replacement Zephyr 4, the 4 indicating that it still used the four-cylinder  engine from Consul 375.  A four-speed manual gearbox, now with synchromesh on all ratios, was standard, with overdrive or automatic transmission available as options. Front disc brakes were standard.
During the production run, the nose styling was changed and the grille lowered. The Zephyr lettering moved from the front edge of the bonnet to below the bonnet opening and the ‘4’ badge below the grille was eliminated.

Zephyr 6 Mark III

Model numbers 213E, 214E (right- and left-hand drive)

The Zephyr Mark III shared some of its mechanical components, as well as the basic chassis design, with the Mark II, but had a stronger overall body construction. The exterior was designed by Canadian Roy Brown, who had also designed the Edsel and the Cortina, though the rear of the body was inspired by a design proposal by Frua. Unlike the Zephyr 4, the Zephyr 6 had a full-width grille including the headlight surrounds; overall body length and width were the same for both Zephyr III versions. With the same  displacement as before, the Mark III model had higher compression ratio, resulting in some  higher output, as well as a broader torque range.

Only saloons and estate cars were made, the estate being a conversion by Abbotts of Farnham.

Abbott Estates

Zodiac Mark III

Model numbers 213E, 214E

The Zodiac was an upmarket version of the Zephyr 6, but differed considerably from that model by the limousine-type rear doors, sharper roofline (with narrower C-pillar) and tail, unique grille (four headlights instead of two), exclusive bumper bars, plusher seating, and up-market upholstery, dashboard, and interior fittings. A choice of individual or bench front seats was available trimmed in leather or cloth. The front doors and bonnet panels were shared with the Zephyr 6. The Executive version had extra luxury fittings again. The 2553 cc, single-carburettor, six-cylinder engine was improved internally to increase the power output to 109 bhp and a new four-speed all synchromesh transmission with column change was fitted. The brakes, servo assisted, use discs at the front and drum at the rear.

The test car cost £1070 including taxes on the UK market.

Ford New Zealand initially built the Zephyr 4 and 6, as well as the Zodiac, locally from CKD kits, offering only the bench front seat option finished in vinyl. Automatic transmission, introduced late in the life of the Mk II, were again available, but were a rare factory option, as most buyers chose manual. As well as the Zephyr 6, Ford NZ built a six-cylinder Zephyr Special (which replaced the 4) with a lower equipment level and deletion of the central vertical grille bar, boot lid trim strip, and other exterior brightwork, which was sold to fleet operators such as the government. The big Fords were unusual in having four-speed manual gearboxes when rivals, including Ford's own Falcon, had only three-speed ones. Building the top luxury Zodiac model locally also gave Ford a supply advantage over key rivals such as GM's Vauxhall, whose upmarket Cresta was not assembled locally after 1960, and once available only as a fully imported model, was much harder to obtain than the locally assembled Velox.

Mark IV

Zephyr Mark IV

Models 3008 / 3010E
In 1961, Ford began a complete redesign on the Zephyr, under the title of "Project Panda". As the car used the new V-series engines, the then traditional long bonnet concept created a problem until design engineer Harley Copp required that the car was both larger and had more internal space, and came up with the idea of placing the spare wheel ahead of the radiator on an angle. The result was a vehicle of similar dimensions to the North American Ford Fairlane.

The Mk IV range was launched, not at an October motor show, but in early 1966 with new V-format engines, the 4 having a  V4 and the  V6 unit. The independent suspension was aided by servo-assisted disc brakes on all wheels.

Criticism of the handling of early examples in the UK led to the fitting as standard of radial-ply tyres on the larger-engined version in place of the more conventional (in the UK at that time) cross-ply tyres with which all versions were shod at the 1966 launch, and the retrofitting of radial-ply tyres to early examples addressed the tendency of the rear wheels to slide uncontrollably in wet weather, justifying in the process Ford's investment in a new and relatively sophisticated rear suspension arrangement for the Mark IVs.  Even after that, a contemporary nevertheless opined that the ride involved a certain amount of 'float', and reported that the nose-heavy handling called for a 'strong driver', a problem which the more expensive Zodiac and Executive versions mitigated through the fitting as a standard feature of power assisted steering. Cost constraints precluded adding power assisted steering for the Zephyr, but during its production run the steering ratio was lowered which reduced the strength needed to change direction by increasing the number of turns between locks from 5.5 to an even higher 6.4.  Another production modification for the 4-cylinder Zephyr involved redesigning the valve gear in order to eliminate the need on the early Mk IVs for frequent tappet adjustments.

The size of the bonnet was emphasized by square-cut styling of the wings. A practical use was found for some of the extra space in front of the driver; the spare wheel was stored, ahead of the engine, under the bonnet, freeing up space at the other end of the car for more luggage.

Although large, the car, at least in its Zephyr form, was not particularly luxurious.   Individual front seats were available at extra cost, but the standard front bench seat was described by one commentator who ran the car on a long-term test as being intended for people no taller than 5 ft 8 in (1.72 m) who have the right leg 3 inches (8 cm) shorter than the left.

An estate version of the Zephyr Mark IV was announced just in time for the London Motor Show in October 1966, though deliveries commenced only in January 1967.  As with the earlier Zephyrs, volumes did not justify tooling up for estate production at the Dagenham plant, and the cars were instead built by E.D. Abbott Ltd of Farnham, based on part finished saloons received from Ford. The Mark IV Zephyr estates (like their more expensive Zodiac siblings) came with black vinyl-covered roof, a fashionable distinguishing feature of upmarket vehicles at the time: retention unchanged of the saloon's rear light clusters attracted criticism, however, because of the way it narrowed the rear hatch opening at floor level when compared to the arrangements on the cheaper Ford Cortina estates.

Export models
In November 1966, the manufacturers announced a plan to introduce an "export special" version of the Zephyr Mk IV combining the 3.0-L engine of the Zodiac with other specifications largely following those of the existing Zephyr. This 3.0-L Zephyr was not offered by Ford on the domestic (UK) market.

This 3.0-litre model was quickly adopted by Ford New Zealand, which had originally launched the Mk IV Zephyr assembled locally from CKD kits with the 2.5-litre V6 (no Zephyr 4 this time) and received complaints it was underpowered for a country where towing boats and caravans was common. Ford New Zealand also introduced optional floor gear shift and bucket seats as an alternative to the standard column shift and bench front seat, and a large number of Zephyrs were built in this form, with other modifications, for New Zealand's traffic police.

The Zodiac was also again assembled in New Zealand with both bench and bucket front seats and Zodiacs from about 1967 also had the walnut dashboard from the U.K. market Executive. An automatic transmission was optional with both the Zephyr and Zodiac. The local Mark IV line did not include the Zephyr Deluxe version available in the UK, was not as popular as the Mark III, and was outsold by the now much wider, locally built Australian Falcon range. Production ended in 1972, and the Consul and Granada replacements introduced in the UK were never officially imported into New Zealand.

South African Zephyrs and Zodiacs all received the 3.0-litre "Export" engine beginning with the 1968 model year. This also included replacing the earlier Zephyr Super with the new Zephyr de luxe, which received the dummy grille as on European cars.

Zodiac and Executive Mark IV

Models 3012E / 3022E

The Zodiac Mark IV and "Executive" had four headlights and an uprated  V6 engine. The Zodiac featured an alternator instead of a dynamo on the Zephyr, an adjustable steering column, a spare wheel in the engine compartment, a heater and Aeroflow ventilation, electric window washers, two-speed wipers, a cigar lighter, rev counter (tachometer), clock, ammeter, and reversing lights as standard.

The Zephyr/Zodiac Mark IVs with their complex independent rear suspension design represented a considerable step up when compared to the Mark III big Fords that they replaced. Ford also determined to widen the price gap between the Zephyr and Zodiac versions. In January 1967, less than a year after the car's introduction, Ford announced that production of the Mark IVs was being cut back in response to poor sales.  The announcement was accompanied by several pieces of more upbeat news about Cortina sales, and it was stressed that workers taken off Zephyr/Zodiac production would all be redeployed on the Cortina production lines.

An estate version of the Zodiac Mk IV was announced at the same time as the Zephyr equivalent, and built alongside it at Farnham.  No "Executive" estate was built.

The "Executive" was an upmarket version, and had the highest specification offered by Ford to UK customers in the 1960s. Automatic transmission (the Zodiac's four-speed manual box with overdrive being also available as a 'no cost' option) along with power steering and a sunroof were standard equipment. Other standard features included fully reclining front seats, walnut fascia, full instrumentation, carpeting throughout, reversing lights, fog lamps, front inertial-reel safety belts, and a radio. The Executive was distinguishable from other models by exterior trim and name badges on the front and rear.

An automatic transmission-equipped Ford Executive was tested by Britain's Autocar in 1967. By these performance criteria, the Ford betrayed its weight, but nevertheless usefully bettered the similarly sized 3.3-L-engined Vauxhall Viscount. The Ford's recommended retail price of £1,567 exceeded the £1,483 sticker price on the Viscount.

References

Further reading

External links

The Mark I Consul, Zephyr and Zodiac Owners Club
The Ford Zephyr and Zodiac Owners Club of South Australia
The classic BBC TV Show "Z Cars"

Zephyr
Rally cars
Touring cars
Cars introduced in 1951
1960s cars
1970s cars
Sedans
Rear-wheel-drive vehicles